Move Me, released 25 September 2000, is the fifth solo album by former Ultravox frontman Midge Ure. Ure produced, arranged  and recorded it almost entirely at home. It was released by BMG Records in continental Europe and was not released in the UK until 14 May 2001 by Curb Records. It was also released in the U.S. by Koch Records.

Background
Promo-videos were made for the first single "You Move Me" and in June 2001 a remixed version of "Beneath A Spielberg Sky". The remix was made by 2Hype, which Ure wasn't fond of.

Ure said about the album in 2000: 

"The Refugee Song" was inspired by the refugee crisis in Kosovo 1999. Midge said 2000 about the song: "The Refugee Song" was re-recorded 2015 and was included as a bonus track on the "Breathe Again Live and Extended" album.

Move Me was re-released 2006, by the German Record label Hypertension, as "Move Me+" with a bonus CD featuring two instrumental tracks called "Higher" and "Fall", plus live tracks recorded in Germany 2000, radio edits and acoustic versions.

Track listing 

All tracks written by Midge Ure; except where indicated

Personnel 
 Midge Ure - Vocals, guitar, keyboards
 Bass – Dave Williamson
 Percussion – Russell Field
 Hammond Organ, Piano – Josh Phillips (tracks: 2, 4, 5)
 Backing Vocals – Angie Brown, Billie Godfrey, Mary Pearce (tracks: 2, 11)
 Keyboards, Piano – Martin Badder (tracks: 6, 7, 10)
 Bass Synthesizer – Bruno Ellingham (track: 7)

References

External links 
AllMusic

2000 albums
Midge Ure albums